Porfirio Gutierrez is a Mexican artisan and advocate specializing in the weaving traditions of Teotitlan del Valle, Oaxaca. He comes from a long line of traditional Zapotec weavers, and the family still is dedicated to this art. Although Gutierrez grew up with the craft and worked looms starting at age 12; at age 18, he went to work in the United States, staying for ten years. Upon returning to Oaxaca, he rediscovered his heritage and the importance of weaving and has since worked to create and promote the making of wool rugs using traditional materials and techniques. In particular he promotes the use of natural dyes, in which his sister Juana specializes. Gutierrez divides his time between Oaxaca and California, not only to sell his family's wares but also to speak and research about weaving and Zapotec culture. This has included a collaboration with the National Museum of the American Indian (Smithsonian).

Background

Gutierrez was born and raised in Teotitlán del Valle, which is known for its weaving, especially wool throw rugs. About 75% of the town's population is involved in weaving in some way. The town depends on the income from the rugs and the tourists the industry attracts. It has a history extending back before the arrival of the Spanish, but its recent success has caused economic and environmental conflicts.

Gutierrez is one of eleven children born to Amado Gutierrez and Andrea Contreras, Zapotec speakers and weavers whose lineage in the craft goes back farther than anyone remembers.

He began weaving at age twelve, learning from his father, but he also took classes with Vergilio Gómez and Carlomagno Pedro Martinez, who encouraged Porfirio to find his own style.

The family is relatively traditional. Porfirio's generation is bilingual Zapotec and Spanish, although the following generation mostly speaks Spanish. Their lack of Spanish limited the parents’ ability to market their rugs.   When an economic downturn hit the area, Porfirio left Teotitlán to migrate to the United States.  From age 18 to 28, he lived in Southern California, which has a large population of people from Oaxaca and other southern states.

Current work

During his time in the United States, Gutierrez did not weave, so when he returned to Teotitlan, the weaving and the culture behind it was a kind of rediscovery. He reorganized the family workshop, with the main operations in Teotitlán and a small studio in Ventura, California, called Indigenous Design Studio.

In Teotitlán, Porfirio works mainly with his sister Juana and her husband, and revolves the workshop around the use of natural dyes, which Juana specializes in. This workshop revolves the central patio of the family home, where areas are set off for dying, drying, weaving and exhibition. Grinding ingredients such as indigo and cochineal on a metate, Juana's skills have allowed her to create a much wider variety of tones than were achieved by her ancestors, able to create about 40 basic colors, with an infinite number of variations.

The workshop doubles as an education center, where visitors get a tour and demonstration of techniques. Porfirio himself works as an advocate, educator, researcher and cultural ambassador as well as weaver, with speaking engagements in the United States. In both Mexico and the United States, Gutierrez advocates for the use of natural dyes, rather than the synthetics used by almost all other weaving families due to ease of use and cost. Only about a dozen families work with natural dyes. Chemical dyes pollute the water and vapors can cause health issues.

His work is important to him not only to make a living but also to maintain contact with his roots. He says that all of his pieces have a story to tell, often related to his ancestors and Zapotec heritage. Zapotec symbolism. “When I say I am Porfirioan Gutiérrez, this means nothing. It’s no responsibility at all, but at the moment I say, I am a native of Teotitlán, descendent of the Zapotec civilization, this brings forth a very large responsibility.”

Since 2012, Gutierrez has been doing research work on Zapotec textiles and natural dyes, along with ancient symbols from the Zapotec culture. In 2016, he was selected for the Artist Leadership Program of the National Museum of the American Indian (Smithsonian) . This permitted him to study the institution's colecctions, up to 200 years old, at the Cultural Center in Suitland, Maryland.

Part of the program is a grant to work and share what he learned with his community. In 2016, Gutierrez initiated a community workshop in Teotitlan. The aim of the workshop is to teach selected young people between the ages of 18 and 26 traditional dying and weaving techniques so that they do not die out.

Although the family business still is based in Teotitlan, Gutierrez divides his time between his hometown and a small studio he has in Ventura, California. It contains a loom, where he works and sells the rugs and tapestries as works of art, using large bundles of yarn dyed by his sister.

Gutierrez is a master weaver whose work has been featured in publications, museums and art galleries in the United States, Europe and Latin America. These include The Work of Art: Folk Artists in the 21st Century,  an honorary mention at Contemporary Indigenous Arts Biennale sponsored by CONACULTA and pieces in the permanent collections of the Smithsonian and Bowers Museums. His work has toured in the United States, England, Egypt, Norway, Denmark and Canada, along with his native Mexico. 

Porfiro's works have been exhibited mostly in the United States, especially in California in institutions such as the Santa Fe International Folk Art Market, the National Museum of the American Indian, the Museum of Ventura County, the Maloof Foundation for Arts and Crafts, the Mexican consulate in Oxnard, the Casa Dolores in Santa Barbara and the Santa Barbara Arts Gallery.  Outside the U.S., his works have appeared in Ecuador, Peru and Toronto, In Mexico, exhibition include those at the Museo Nacional de Culturas Populares in Mexico City and the Casa de Cultura in Puebla. His first exhibition in Oaxaca was in 2016 at the family's compound.

Process

The Gutierrez family workshops primarily make rugs and tapestries, but also make smaller items such as coasters and mats. Various members of the family weave and do other tasks, but Porfirio supervises the development of all pieces. Although his mother spins some of the yarn they use, most is bought from another town, so the process most often begin with dyeing. They exclusively use natural dyes made from ingredients sourced from Oaxaca, such as cochineal, tree moss, pomegranate, Mexican tarragon and indigo.

The weaving is done on pedal looms, with the wool yarn wound on bobbins and woven through cotton/wool blend threads. A 3x5 foot rug can take several weeks to produce. The largest pieces can take as long as eight months.

The family produces both purely traditional designs and more original ones, which themselves do not stray too far from the family's Zapotec roots. Influences in textile designs include pre Hispanic fretwork, glyphs, elements from new archeological finds. Most are sold in the United States, through institutions such as museums. The more innovative designs are popular in California. Each piece is unique and often in a variety of vibrant and earth tones.

References

External links

Mexican handicrafts
Weaving families